Bucculatrix niveella is a moth in the family Bucculatricidae. It is found in North America, where it has been recorded from Texas and Maine. It was described by Vactor Tousey Chambers in 1875. Adults have been recorded on wing from June to August.

References

Natural History Museum Lepidoptera generic names catalog

Bucculatricidae
Moths described in 1875
Moths of North America